Trevor Herion, born John Trevor Herion, (c. April 1959 – 1 October 1988) was an Irish singer and songwriter, born in Cork who formed part of the punk and new wave scenes in the 1970s and 1980s. He later became a solo artist, but was not commercially successful and died in 1988.

Life and career
During the late 1970s, he was lead vocalist in a locally successful pub band called "The B-52s", who later changed their name to "The Puritans" on discovering the existence of the similarly named US band. Failure to land a recording contract meant the band's dissolution but shortly after he was called to join as lead vocalist in a new wave band called the Civilians, comprised by Paul Simon (former Neo and Radio Stars) on drums, Mark Scholfield on guitar and Michael French on bass. The band only released two singles: Made for Television/I See My Friends (Arista, November 1979) and without Herion or Simon and featuring Michael French on lead vocals In America/In Search of Pleasure (Secret, September 1980). After that, the band broke up (Later, Scholfield and French formed Academy One).

By 1980 or 1981, Herion and Simon reunited in another band, the Fallout Club, alongside former Bruce Woolley and the Camera Club's Thomas Dolby and Matthew Seligman. They only released three singles, which were "Falling Years"/"The Beat Boys", "Dream Soldiers", "Pedestrian Walkway", "Wonderlust"/"Desert Song" (Happy Birthday Records, 1981).

After Fallout Club broke up, Herion went solo. He released a number of singles and an unsuccessful studio album called Beauty Life (1983), an album produced by Steve Levine, best known for his work with Culture Club. The sleeve of Beauty Life and its singles were designed by famed Factory Records designer Peter Saville. Nevertheless, an argument over the unauthorised remixing of a 7" version resulted in Levine taking his name off the album and refusing to promote it.

During the 1980s, Herion began to suffer from severe depression. He died from suicide on 1 October 1988 at the age of 28.

Discography
Studio album
 Beauty Life (1983)

Singles
 "Kiss of No Return" (1982)
 "Dreamtime" (1983)
 "Fallen Angel" (1983)
 "Love Chains" (1983)

References

External links
 Trevor Herion — Forever Young Fledgling Trevor Herion tribute web
 
 

1959 births
20th-century Irish male singers
Irish new wave musicians
1988 suicides
Suicides in the Republic of Ireland
People from County Cork